Muckkana malai patti  is a village in the  
Annavasal revenue block of Pudukkottai district, Tamil Nadu, India.

References

Villages in Pudukkottai district